Ivan Belfiore (born 4 September 1960) is a Canadian former professional soccer player who played as a defender.

Career
Born in Vancouver, British Columbia, Belfiore played as a professional in the North American Soccer League, the Major Indoor Soccer League, the Western Soccer Alliance and the Canadian Soccer League for the Detroit Express, the Washington Diplomats, the Chicago Sting, the Tulsa Roughnecks, the Edmonton Brick Men and Vancouver 86ers.

Belfiore made four appearances for the Canadian under-20 national team during the 1978 CONCACAF U-20 tournament, and he also played one game for the Canadian Olympic Team during qualifications for the 1980 Summer Olympics.

References

1960 births
Living people
Canadian expatriate sportspeople in the United States
Canadian expatriate soccer players
Canadian soccer players
Chicago Sting (MISL) players
Chicago Sting (NASL) players
Detroit Express players
Edmonton Brick Men players
Canadian Soccer League (1987–1992) players
Expatriate soccer players in the United States
Association football defenders
Major Indoor Soccer League (1978–1992) players
North American Soccer League (1968–1984) indoor players
North American Soccer League (1968–1984) players
Soccer players from Vancouver
Tulsa Roughnecks (1978–1984) players
Vancouver Whitecaps (1986–2010) players
Washington Diplomats (NASL) players
Western Soccer Alliance players
Canada men's youth international soccer players
Canada men's under-23 international soccer players
Vancouver Columbus players